Kim Pan-keun (Korean: 김판근, born 5 March 1966) is former South Korean footballer.

International career 
When South Korea reached the semi-finals in the 1983 FIFA World Youth Championship, Kim was a key member of the semi-finalists and became the only South Korean player to be selected for the All-Star Team. After the World Youth Championship, he was called up to senior national team that year, becoming the youngest South Korean player to make a senior international debut. (17 years, 241 days) He also participated in the 1994 FIFA World Cup.

Personal life
Kim's son, Danny Kim, is also a footballer and has played for Brisbane Roar in the A-League and the Australian under-17 national side.

Career statistics

Club

International 
Results list South Korea's goal tally first.

Honours
Korea University
Korean National Championship: 1985

Daewoo Royals 
K League 1: 1987, 1991
Korean National Championship: 1989

Anyang LG Cheetahs
Korean League Cup runner-up: 1994

South Korea U20
AFC Youth Championship: 1982

South Korea
Asian Games bronze medal: 1990
Afro-Asian Cup of Nations: 1987
Dynasty Cup: 1990

Individual
FIFA World Youth Championship All-Star Team: 1983
K League 1 Best XI: 1993, 1995

References

External links
 
 
 

1966 births
Living people
Association football midfielders
South Korean footballers
South Korean expatriate footballers
South Korea international footballers
Busan IPark players
FC Seoul players
Marconi Stallions FC players
K League 1 players
National Soccer League (Australia) players
Expatriate soccer players in Australia
1994 FIFA World Cup players
1996 AFC Asian Cup players
Footballers at the 1988 Summer Olympics
Olympic footballers of South Korea
South Korean expatriate sportspeople in Australia
Korea University alumni
Asian Games medalists in football
Footballers at the 1990 Asian Games
Asian Games bronze medalists for South Korea
Medalists at the 1990 Asian Games